The 1936 San Francisco Dons football team was an American football team that represented the University of San Francisco as an independent during the 1936 college football season. In their fifth and final season under head coach Spud Lewis, the Dons compiled a 4–4–2 record and were outscored by their opponents by a combined total of 114 to 103.

Schedule

References

San Francisco
San Francisco Dons football seasons
San Francisco Dons football